Los Angeles Croatia was a soccer team based in Los Angeles.

History

The club originally was established in 1959, under the name “Bosna”. It officially change the name to “Croatia” in 1963. The club was National Challenge Cup's runner-up in 1970.

Winners of the first West Coast Croatian tournament in 1973.

Clubs was restarted in 1997.

Honors
National Challenge Cup
Runner-up (1): 1970

References

Defunct soccer clubs in California